is an airport in the Hikawa area of Izumo, Shimane Prefecture, Japan, about 20–30 minutes by car from central Izumo or Matsue city centre.

History 
The airport opened in June 1966 with a runway length of 1,200 m. The runway was extended to 1,500 m in December 1970, and 2,000 m in March 1991.

Scheduled service began in July 1966, with a daily YS-11 flight to Osaka and a daily de Havilland Heron flight to Oki. YS-11 service to Tokyo began in 1979, and was upgraded to DC-9 jet service in 1980 and A300 widebody service in 1993. Routes added since then include Fukuoka (YS-11 from December 1984), Hiroshima-Nishi (BAe Jetstream from 1996), Sapporo (MD-87 from 1996), Komatsu (BAe Jetstream from 1996), Okinawa (MD-90 from 1997), and Nagoya (Saab 340 from 1997).

Facilities 
The airport terminal has three jet bridge gates, and is equipped with customs and immigration facilities for international charter flights. The Shimane Prefectural Police also has an air base on site.

Airlines and destinations

Statistics

Ground transportation 
Bus service is available to Matsue and Izumo. There is no rail service to the airport; the closest railway station is Shōbara Station, about 10 minutes away by car.

References

External links

 Izumo Airport website 
 Izumo Airport Guide from Japan Airlines
 
 

Airports in Japan
Transport in Shimane Prefecture
Buildings and structures in Shimane Prefecture